The 2010 Carisap Tennis Cup was a professional tennis tournament played on outdoor red clay courts. This was the sixth edition of the tournament which is part of the 2010 ATP Challenger Tour. It took place in San Benedetto, Italy between 5 July and 11 July 2010.

Singles main draw entrants

Seeds

 Rankings are as of June 21, 2010.

Other entrants
The following players received wildcards into the singles main draw:
  Thomas Fabbiano
  Enrico Fioravante
  Daniel Gimeno-Traver
  Giacomo Miccini

The following players received entry from the qualifying draw:
  Manuel Cavaco (as a Lucky Loser)
  Gonçalo Pereira
  Janez Semrajc
  Dmitri Sitak
  Pedro Sousa

Champions

Singles

 Carlos Berlocq def.  Daniel Gimeno-Traver 6–3, 4–6, 6–4

Doubles

 Thomas Fabbiano /  Gabriel Trujillo-Soler def.  Francesco Aldi /  Daniele Giorgini, 7–6(4), 7–6(5).

References
Official website

Carisap Tennis Cup
Clay court tennis tournaments
ATP Challenger San Benedetto